Lee Murray (born 1965) is a New Zealand science fiction, fantasy, and horror writer and editor. She is a multiple winner of the Bram Stoker Award and a twelve-time winner of the Sir Julius Vogel Award. She is most noted for her Taine McKenna military thrillers, and supernatural crime-noir series The Path of Ra.

Biography
Murray was born in Putāruru, Waikato. She previously worked as a scientist and an advisor for the OECD. She is the co-founder of Young New Zealand Writers with Piper Mejia, an organization which has provided development and publishing opportunities for New Zealand school students. She suffers from anxiety and depression. She currently lives in Tauranga.

Awards
Her anthologies Hellhole: An Anthology of Subterranean Terror and Black Cranes: Tales of Unquiet Women won the Bram Stoker Award for "Superior Achievement in an Anthology" in 2018 and 2020 respectively, while her collection Grotesque: Monster Stories won the "Superior Achievement in a Fiction Collection " category in 2020. Other works have won the Australian Shadows and Sir Julius Vogel awards.  She was the winner of the 2019 Bram Stoker Mentor of the year award. She is a professional member of the Horror Writers Association,  Australian Horror Writers Association, and the New Zealand Society of Authors. In 2020 she was awarded the New Zealand Society of Authors Honorary Literary Fellowship. In 2021 she was awarded the Grimshaw Sargeson 2021 Fellowship.

Works as author

Works as editor

References

Living people
1965 births
New Zealand science fiction writers
21st-century New Zealand women writers
People from Putāruru
People from Tauranga